is a shallow bay in eastern Hokkaido, Japan, separated from Nemuro Bay and the Sea of Okhotsk by the curving Notsuke Peninsula. Together with Notsuke Peninsula, by which it is largely enclosed, Notsuke Bay has been designated a Ramsar Site, as a  wetland of international importance, a Special Wildlife Protection Area, and an Important Bird Area, and forms part of Notsuke-Fūren Prefectural Natural Park. Water fowl include the grey-tailed tattler, redshank, whooper swan, brent goose, wigeon, scaup, and common goldeneye.

See also

 List of Ramsar sites in Japan
 Nemuro Strait
 Kunashir Island
 Ishikari Bay

References

Bays of Japan
Bays of the Sea of Okhotsk
Landforms of Hokkaido
Betsukai, Hokkaido
Ramsar sites in Japan